The 1932 St. Louis Browns season involved the Browns finishing 6th in the American League with a record of 63 wins and 91 losses.

Regular season

Season standings

Record vs. opponents

Notable transactions 
 April 27, 1932: Red Kress was traded by the Browns to the Chicago White Sox for Bruce Campbell and Bump Hadley.
 September 9, 1932: Chad Kimsey was purchased from the Browns by the Chicago White Sox.

Roster

Player stats

Batting

Starters by position 
Note: Pos = Position; G = Games played; AB = At bats; H = Hits; Avg. = Batting average; HR = Home runs; RBI = Runs batted in

Other batters 
Note: G = Games played; AB = At bats; H = Hits; Avg. = Batting average; HR = Home runs; RBI = Runs batted in

Pitching

Starting pitchers 
Note: G = Games pitched; IP = Innings pitched; W = Wins; L = Losses; ERA = Earned run average; SO = Strikeouts

Other pitchers 
Note: G = Games pitched; IP = Innings pitched; W = Wins; L = Losses; ERA = Earned run average; SO = Strikeouts

Relief pitchers 
Note: G = Games pitched; W = Wins; L = Losses; SV = Saves; ERA = Earned run average; SO = Strikeouts

Farm system 

 
LEAGUE CHAMPIONS: Rock IslandWichita Falls transferred to Longview and renamed, May 20; Fort Smith franchise transferred to Muskogee and renamed, July 1, 1932

Notes

References 
1932 St. Louis Browns team page at Baseball Reference
1932 St. Louis Browns season at baseball-almanac.com

St. Louis Browns seasons
Saint Louis Browns season
St Louis Browns